Oleksiy Oleksandrovych Leonov (born 26 February 1983) is a Ukrainian politician currently serving as a People's Deputy of Ukraine representing Ukraine's 162nd electoral district from Servant of the People since 29 August 2019.

Early life and career 
Oleksiy Oleksandrovych Leonov was born on 26 February 1983 in the city of Odesa, then under the rule of the Soviet Union. He is a graduate of the Odesa Maritime Tourist Service Higher Vocational School, and is trained in cooking. He is co-owner of the restaurant chain Pizza&Grill and the Slow Piggy restaurant, having also worked as a chef in London and Estonia.

Since 2014, Leonov has been engaged in social activities, including leading the public campaign "I'm an Odesan, and I don't care". He also worked as an assistant to People's Deputy of Ukraine Vitalii Kurylo.

Political career 
Leonov ran in the 2019 Ukrainian parliamentary election to be a People's Deputy from Ukraine's 135th electoral district in the city of Odesa. At the time of the election, he was an independent. He was successfully elected, defeating independent incumbent Serhii Kivalov with 40.21% of the vote to Kivalov's 31.63%.

In the Verkhovna Rada (Ukraine's parliament), Leonov joined the Servant of the People faction, as well as the Verkhovna Rada Committee on Finance, Tax, and Customs Policy. On 10 November 2019, Leonov became a member of the Servant of the People party. Leonov acquired attention and controversy for not supporting a bill which would have reduced corrupt practices within the real estate industry, a position supported by independent People's Deputy and real estate magnate Anton Yatsenko. Anti-corruption non-governmental organisation Chesno also criticised Leonov for breaching financial disclosure laws by not stating that he spent over ₴92,000 in online advertisements during his campaign.

References 

1983 births
Living people
Ninth convocation members of the Verkhovna Rada
Politicians from Odesa
Servant of the People (political party) politicians